Crosses EP is the first EP by José González, released in 2003. All of the songs on this EP would later be included on his debut album Veneer, except for "Storm". All songs were written by José González.

Track listing

 "Crosses" – 2:42
 "Hints" – 3:51
 "Deadweight on Velveteen" – 3:35
 "Storm" – 2:49

Contributions

The song "Crosses" was used for the soundtrack of the 2015 video game Life Is Strange.

José González (singer) EPs
2003 debut EPs